Bendolph may refer to:

Annie Bendolph (1900–1981), American artist and quilter
Louisiana Bendolph (born 1960),  American visual artist and quilt maker
Mary Lee Bendolph (born 1935), American quilt maker